Godofredo Castro (born July 2, 1987), better known as Godofredo Pepey, is a Brazilian mixed martial artist who currently fights in the lightweight division of Brave Combat Federation. A professional MMA competitor since 2003, Pepey has also competed in the UFC and was the Featherweight runner up on Globo's The Ultimate Fighter: Brazil.

Mixed martial arts career
Pepey got his start in martial arts training alongside his brother, Godofredo Claudio, a black belt in Brazilian jiu-jitsu. Pepey had his first professional MMA fight in 2003, at the age of fifteen, winning the fight via submission (armbar) in the first round. Pepey took a three-year hiatus from fighting after making his debut. He returned to active competition in April 2006 with a win over William Couto via submission. Pepey took an 18-month layoff from fighting before coming back with a win over Jesse Santiago via first round submission.

After going 3-0, Pepey again took a lengthy time off from MMA competition. He took nearly three years off for the second time in his career before coming back to earn his TKO victory over Nino Bala on February 6, 2010. Pepey continued fighting regularly, earning another stoppage win on July 3, 2010 in a rematch against Leandro Rodrigues Pontes after Leandro submitted due to strikes. He fought debuting fighter, Fabio Emanuel Rodrigues, at Combat Fighters Championship 1 on September 18, 2010. Pepey dominated the fight throughout the first round, and won the fight after Rorigues did not answer for the second round. Pepey earned two more first round submission wins, bringing his record to 8-0, before trying out for the first installment of The Ultimate Fighter: Brazil.

The Ultimate Fighter
In March 2012, it was revealed that Pepey was selected to be a participant on The Ultimate Fighter: Brazil. Pepey defeated Johnny Goncalves via submission in the first round to move into the Ultimate Fighter house, and become an official cast member.

Pepey was selected as the sixth pick (twelfth overall) by Vitor Belfort, to be a part of Team Vitor. In the first quarter-final fight Pepey was selected to fight Wagner Campos. Pepey won via unanimous decision after two rounds.

After Team Vitor went 7-1, Dana White demanded the teams being scrambled in order to make it a fair contest. Pepey was selected by Belfort to go to Team Wanderlei. Pepey was selected to fight Strikeforce veteran Rodrigo Damm in the first semi-final fight. However, after the doctors removed Damm from the competition, Pepey fought Marcos Vinicius. Pepey won the fight via second round submission, advancing him to the finals of the featherweight tournament.

Ultimate Fighting Championship
Pepey made his UFC debut at UFC 147 on June 23, 2012 against Rony Jason to determine the featherweight winner of The Ultimate Fighter: Brazil. He lost the fight via unanimous decision.

In his second fight for the promotion, Pepey faced Milton Vieira on January 19, 2013 at UFC on FX 7. He won the fight via split decision.

Pepey faced Felipe Arantes on June 8, 2013 at UFC on Fuel TV 10. He lost the fight via TKO in the first round.

Pepey was expected to face Sam Sicilia on September 4, 2013 at UFC Fight Night 28. However, Sicilia pulled out of the bout citing an injury and was replaced by Felipe Arantes.

The bout with Sicilia eventually took place on November 9, 2013 at UFC Fight Night 32. Pepey lost the fight via TKO in the first round.

Pepey faced promotional newcomer Noad Lahat on March 23, 2014 at UFC Fight Night 38. He won the fight in spectacular fashion by landing a flying knee in the first round for a knockout. The win also earned Pepey his first Performance of the Night bonus award.

Pepey faced Dashon Johnson at UFC Fight Night 51 on September 13, 2014. He won the fight via submission in the first round. This win also earned him his second consecutive Performance of the Night bonus award.

Pepey faced Andre Fili on March 21, 2015 at UFC Fight Night 62. He won the fight via submission in the first round with a triangle choke. This win earned him his third straight Performance of the Night bonus award.

Pepey next faced Darren Elkins on July 23, 2016 at UFC on Fox 20. He lost the fight via unanimous decision.

Pepey faced Mike De La Torre on September 24, 2016 at UFC Fight Night 95. He won the fight via submission in the first round.

Pepey faced Shane Burgos on July 22, 2017 at UFC on Fox 25. He lost the fight via unanimous decision.

Pepey faced Mirsad Bektić on January 27, 2018 at UFC on Fox 27. He lost the fight via technical knock out.

On April 4, 2018, it was announced Pepey was a free agent after the UFC opted not to renew his contract.

Post-UFC career

After leaving the UFC, Pepey fought Alex Torres at Brave CF 15 on September 7, 2018. Pepey won the fight via armbar in the first round.

Pepey faced Abdoul Abdouraguimov on February 3, 2022 at Ares FC 3 for the AFC Welterweight Championship. He lost the bout via inverted triangle choke in the first round.

Championships and achievements

Mixed martial arts 
 Ultimate Fighting Championship
The Ultimate Fighter: Brazil Featherweight Tournament Runner Up
Performance of the Night (Three times)

Mixed martial arts record

|-
|Loss
|align=center|14–7 (1)
|Abdoul Abdouraguimov
|Submission (inverted triangle choke)
|Ares FC 3
|
|align=center|1
|align=center|2:06
|Paris, France
|
|-
|NC
|align=center|14–6 (1)
|Pavel Gordeev
|No Contest (illegal knee)
|RCC Intro 3
|
|align=center|1
|align=center|N/A
|Ekaterinburg, Russia
|
|-
|Win
|align=center|14–6
|Alex Torres
|Submission (armbar)
|Brave CF 15
|
|align=center|1
|align=center|3:50
|Bucaramanga, Colombia
|
|-
|Loss
|align=center|13–6
|Mirsad Bektić
|TKO (body punch)
|UFC on Fox: Jacaré vs. Brunson 2
|
|align=center|1
|align=center|2:47
|Charlotte, North Carolina, United States
|
|-
|Loss
|align=center|13–5
|Shane Burgos
|Decision (unanimous)
|UFC on Fox: Weidman vs. Gastelum
|
|align=center|3
|align=center|5:00
|Uniondale, New York, United States
|
|-
|Win
|align=center|13–4
|Mike De La Torre
|Submission (rear-naked choke)
|UFC Fight Night: Cyborg vs. Länsberg
|
|align=center|1
|align=center|3:03
|Brasília, Brazil
|
|-
|Loss
|align=center|12–4
|Darren Elkins
|Decision (unanimous)
|UFC on Fox: Holm vs. Shevchenko
|
|align=center|3
|align=center|5:00
|Chicago, Illinois, United States
|
|-
|Win
|align=center|12–3
|Andre Fili
|Submission (flying triangle choke)
|UFC Fight Night: Maia vs. LaFlare
|
|align=center|1
|align=center|3:14 
|Rio de Janeiro, Brazil
|
|-
|Win
|align=center|11–3
|Dashon Johnson
|Submission (triangle armbar)
|UFC Fight Night: Bigfoot vs. Arlovski
| 
|align=center|1
|align=center|4:29
|Brasília, Brazil
|
|-
|Win
|align=center|10–3
|Noad Lahat
|KO (flying knee)
|UFC Fight Night: Shogun vs. Henderson 2
| 
|align=center|1
|align=center|2:39
|Natal, Brazil
|
|-
|Loss
|align=center|9–3
|Sam Sicilia
|TKO (punches)
|UFC Fight Night: Belfort vs. Henderson 2
|
|align=center|1
|align=center|1:42
|Goiânia, Brazil
|
|-
|Loss
|align=center|9–2
|Felipe Arantes
|TKO (elbows and punches)
|UFC on Fuel TV: Nogueira vs. Werdum
|
|align=center|1
|align=center|3:32
|Fortaleza, Brazil
|
|-
|Win
|align=center|9–1
|Milton Vieira
|Decision (split)
|UFC on FX: Belfort vs. Bisping
|
|align=center|3
|align=center|5:00
|São Paulo, Brazil
|
|-
|Loss
|align=center|8–1
|Rony Jason
|Decision (unanimous)
|UFC 147
|
|align=center|3
|align=center|5:00
|Belo Horizonte, Brazil
| 
|-
|Win
|align=center|8–0
|Kelles Albuquerque
|Submission (arm-triangle choke)
|Ceará Fighters 2
|
|align=center|1
|align=center|1:29
|Juazeiro do Norte, Brazil
|
|-
|Win
|align=center|7–0
|Leandro Tavares
|Submission (armbar)
|Champions Night 15
|
|align=center|1
|align=center|2:03
|São Benedito, Brazil
|
|-
|Win
|align=center|6–0
|Fabio Emanuel 
|TKO (retirement)
|Ceará Fighters 1
|
|align=center|1
|align=center|5:00
|Juazeiro do Norte, Brazil
|
|-
|Win
|align=center|5–0
|Leandro Pontes
|TKO (body punches)
|Sertao Fights 1
|
|align=center|1
|align=center|3:44
|Tauá, Brazil
|
|-
|Win
|align=center|4–0
|Nino Bala
|TKO (punches)
|Champions Night 13
|
|align=center|1
|align=center|1:06
|Fortaleza, Brazil
|
|-
|Win
|align=center|3–0
|Jesse Santiago
|Submission (armbar)
|Rino's FC 4
|
|align=center|1
|align=center|N/A
|Fortaleza, Brazil
|
|-
|Win
|align=center|2–0
|William Couto
|Submission (guillotine choke)
|Tridenium Combat 1
|
|align=center|3
|align=center|2:03
|Fortaleza, Brazil
|
|-
|Win
|align=center|1–0
|Leandro Pontes
|Submission (armbar)
|Shock FC 3
|
|align=center|1
|align=center|3:11
|Fortaleza, Brazil
|

Mixed martial arts exhibition record

|-
|Win
|align=center|3–0
|Marcos Vinicius
|Submission (armbar)
|The Ultimate Fighter: Brazil
| (airdate)
|align=center|1
|align=center|0:00
|São Paulo, Brazil
|
|-
|Win
|align=center|2–0
|Wagner Campos
|Decision (unanimous)
|The Ultimate Fighter: Brazil
| (airdate)
|align=center|2
|align=center|5:00
|São Paulo, Brazil
|
|-
|Win
|align=center|1–0
|Jhonny Gonçalves
|Submission (triangle choke)
|The Ultimate Fighter: Brazil
| (airdate)
|align=center|1
|align=center|0:00
|São Paulo, Brazil
|
|-

See also
 List of current UFC fighters
 List of male mixed martial artists

References

External links
 
 
 
 

1987 births
Living people
Brazilian male mixed martial artists
Mixed martial artists utilizing Brazilian jiu-jitsu
Brazilian practitioners of Brazilian jiu-jitsu
People awarded a black belt in Brazilian jiu-jitsu
Ultimate Fighting Championship male fighters
Sportspeople from Fortaleza